The Devils of Loudun is a 1952 non-fiction novel by Aldous Huxley.

Premise
It is a historical narrative of supposed demonic possession, religious fanaticism, sexual repression, and mass hysteria that occurred in 17th-century France surrounding unexplained events that took place in the small town of Loudun. It centers on Roman Catholic priest Urbain Grandier and an entire convent of Ursuline nuns, who allegedly became possessed by demons after Grandier made a pact with Satan. The events led to several public exorcisms as well as executions by burning.

The book, though lesser known than Huxley's other books, is considered one of his best works.

Historical details
Urbain Grandier was a priest burned at the stake at Loudun, France on 18 August 1634. He was accused of seducing an entire convent of Ursuline nuns and of being in league with the devil. Grandier was likely promiscuous and was insolent towards his peers. He had antagonized the Mother Superior, Sister Jeanne of the Angels, when he rejected her offer to become the spiritual advisor to the convent. He faced an ecclesiastical tribunal and was acquitted.

It was only after he had publicly spoken against Cardinal Richelieu that a new trial was ordered by the Cardinal. He was tortured, found guilty and executed by being burnt alive, but never admitted guilt. Huxley touches on aspects of the multiple personality controversy in cases of apparent demonic possession within this book.

Adaptations
The story was adapted into a 1960 stage play by playwright John Whiting, which was, in turn, adapted into the twice-filmed 1969 opera Die Teufel von Loudun by Krzysztof Penderecki and the 1971 Ken Russell feature film The Devils starring Vanessa Redgrave and Oliver Reed.

See also
 The Loudun possessions — historical events the book was based upon
 Dreams of Roses and Fire — a 1949 novel by Eyvind Johnson based on the same events.
 Mother Joan of the Angels — a 1961 Polish film
 The Devils

References

External links
 

1952 non-fiction books
Books by Aldous Huxley
Chatto & Windus books
Non-fiction novels
Works adapted into operas
Works about sexual repression